Fyodor II Borisovich Godunov (1589 – 20 June 1605) was tsar of Russia during the spring of 1605, at the beginning of the Time of Troubles.

Life
Fyodor II was born in Moscow, the son and successor to Boris Godunov. His mother Maria Grigorievna Skuratova-Belskaya was one of the daughters of Malyuta Skuratov, the infamous favourite of Ivan the Terrible.

Physically robust and passionately beloved by his father, he received the best education available at that time, and from childhood was initiated into all the minutiae of government, besides sitting regularly in the council and receiving the foreign envoys. He seems also to have been remarkably and precociously intelligent, creating a map of Russia, which is still preserved. 
It was edited with some additions by Hessel Gerritsz in Amsterdam, in 1613, and had been reedited until 1665.

On the sudden death of Boris the sixteen-year-old was proclaimed tsar (13 April 1605). Though his father had taken the precaution to surround him with powerful friends, he lived from the first moment of his reign in an atmosphere of treachery. 
On 11 June (N. S.) 1605 the envoys of False Dmitriy I arrived at Moscow to demand his removal, and the letters that they read publicly in Red Square decided his fate. A group of boyars, unwilling to swear allegiance to the new tsar, seized control of the Kremlin and arrested him. 

On June 10th or 20th, Feodor was strangled in his apartment, together with his mother. Officially, he was declared to have been poisoned, but the Swedish diplomat Peter Petreius stated that the bodies, which had been on public display, showed traces of a violent struggle. Although aged 16, Feodor was known to be physically strong and agile, and it took four men to overpower him.

See also
 Bibliography of Russian history (1223–1613)
 Tsars of Russia family tree

References

Attribution:

1589 births
1605 deaths
17th-century Russian monarchs
Russian tsars
Cartographers from the Russian Empire
Murdered Russian monarchs
Eastern Orthodox monarchs
Leaders ousted by a coup
Murdered royalty
16th-century Russian people
House of Godunov
Deaths by strangulation
Russian tsareviches
17th-century murdered monarchs
Murder in 1605